Vanilla pompona is a species of vanilla orchid. It is native to Mexico and northern South America, and is one of the sources for vanilla flavouring, due to its high vanillin content.

Vanilla pompona found in the Peruvian Amazon has been tested using HPLC analysis showing a concentration of vanillin content up to 9.88g/100g making it suitable for the food or cosmetic industry.

Description

Like all members of the genus Vanilla, V. pompona is a vine. It uses its fleshy roots to support itself as it grows. Its leaves and stems are generally thicker than in V. planifolia and V. phaeantha.

References

External links
 
 

pompona
Orchids of Mexico
Orchids of Central America
Orchids of South America
Crops originating from Mexico
Orchids of Florida